Heterochaenia is a genus of flowering plants within the family Campanulaceae which are native to Réunion.

Species include:

 Heterochaenia borbonica Badre & Cadet
 Heterochaenia ensifolia A.DC. 
 Heterochaenia rivalsii Badre & Cadet

References

Campanuloideae
Campanulaceae genera
Endemic flora of Réunion